Xirocourt is a commune in the Meurthe-et-Moselle department in north-eastern France.

Population

Geography
The river Madon flows through the commune.

Historic Features
A watermill dating from the 18th century is situated on the Madon, and a monumental bridge spans the same river.

Religious Constructs

In the commune, there is a 19th-century church and a chapel, Chapelle Notre-Dame de Pitié.  There is also a 16th-century vicarage, renovated in the 19th century.

See also
 Communes of the Meurthe-et-Moselle department

References

Communes of Meurthe-et-Moselle